Peter Wolf is an American musician.

Peter Wolf may also refer to:

Peter Wolf (producer) (born 1952), Austrian keyboard player
Peter M. Wolf (born 1935), American author, investment manager, and philanthropist
Peter Wolf, who played for Austria national basketball team

See also
Peter Wolfe (disambiguation)
Peter Wolff (disambiguation)